Steel and Lace is a 1991 science fiction action film directed by Ernest D. Farino and starring Clare Wren, Bruce Davison, Stacy Haiduk, David Naughton, and Michael Cerveris.

Plot 
Gaily Morton, a classical concert pianist, is raped by businessman Daniel Emerson. Her brother Albert takes time off from his career as a robot scientist to represent his sister at the criminal trial. However Daniel has gotten several of his friends to provide an alibi for the night of the rape, and he is found not guilty.
Gaily is horrified by the verdict and commits suicide by jumping off the court building, despite her brother's pleas.

Albert uses his knowledge of robotics to resurrect his sister as a cyborg, which he then sends after Daniel and his business partners - the men who provided false witness in court.

Cast 
 Clare Wren as Gaily Morton
 Bruce Davison as Albert Morton
 Stacy Haiduk as Alison
 David Naughton as Detective Dunn
 Michael Cerveris as Daniel Emerson
 Scott Burkholder as Tobby
 Paul Lieber as Oscar
 Brian Backer as Norman
 John J. York as Craig
 Nick Tate as Duncan
 David L. Lander as Schumann
 John DeMita as Agent Spoon
 Cindy Brooks as Girl in T-Bird
 William Prince as Old Man

Reception

On Rotten Tomatoes there are 2 reviews listed, both are negative.

References

External links
 
 

1991 films
1990s English-language films
1990s American films
1990s science fiction horror films
1990s science fiction action films
American science fiction action films
American science fiction horror films
Android (robot) films
American rape and revenge films
Cyborg films
Fictional duos
Films shot in Los Angeles